Borboniella striatella is a species of moth of the family Tortricidae. It was described by Christian Guillermet in 2012 and is endemic to Réunion.

References

External links

Moths described in 2012
Endemic fauna of Réunion
Borboniella
Moths of Africa